Class 72 may refer to:
NSB Class 72, a Norwegian passenger train.
 German passenger tank locomotives with a 4-4-0T wheel arrangement operated by the Deutsche Reichsbahn comprising the:
 Class 72.0: Prussian T 5.2
 Class 72.1: Bavarian Pt 2/4 N